The U.S.-Remix Album: All or Nothing is a remix album by Milli Vanilli released in 1989 outside of North America. It contains remixes of tracks from All or Nothing as well as tracks from the group's North American debut album Girl You Know It's True that did not appear on All or Nothing. In the United Kingdom, rather than being given a stand-alone release, the album was packaged together with All or Nothing under the title 2×2. 2×2 was also released in France,
where the remix album was available on its own.

The U.S.-Remix Album/2×2 had more chart success than All or Nothing in most territories. It reached #1 in the Netherlands, Australia and New Zealand and the top ten in the UK, Germany and several other countries.

A conceptually similar album, The Remix Album, was released one year later in the U.S. in 1990. The Remix Album includes extended, remixed versions of the group's singles and tracks which were exclusive to the European studio album All or Nothing.

Track listing

* Some editions list erroneous track lengths (for instance, the German CD release). Listed here are the lengths generally accepted as standard for all releases regardless of what is printed.

Personnel
 Charles Shaw – vocals, backing vocals
 John Davis – vocals, backing vocals
 Brad Howell – vocals
 Frank Farian – producer
 Tobias Freund, Bernd Berwanger, Norbert Janicke, Jens Seekamp – mixing
 P.G. Wilder, Pit Loew, Toby Gad, Jens Gad – arrangements

Charts

Weekly charts

Sales and certifications

References

Albums produced by Frank Farian
1989 remix albums
Hansa Records albums
Bertelsmann Music Group remix albums